Carl E. Loyd (November 24, 1925 – August 29, 2012) was an American professional basketball player. He played for the Hammond Calumet Buccaneers in the National Basketball League during the 1948–49 season and averaged 3.3 points per game. Serving in the Navy during World War II split his collegiate career at the University of Notre Dame.

References

1925 births
2012 deaths
American men's basketball players
United States Navy personnel of World War II
Basketball players from Illinois
Basketball players from South Bend, Indiana
Guards (basketball)
Hammond Calumet Buccaneers players
Notre Dame Fighting Irish men's basketball players